The Col du Perthus (in Catalan: Coll de Pertús) is a mountain pass of the Pyrenees on the France–Spain border, between the Pyrénées-Orientales in Languedoc-Roussillon, Midi-Pyrénées and the Province of Girona in Catalonia.

It marks the western boundary of the Albera Massif. The village of Le Perthus was founded at the col in 1836. The location is the subject of a noted engraving by Gustave Doré, reproduced in Doré’s Spain.

See also
 List of mountain passes

References

Mountain passes of the Pyrenees
Perthus
Mountain passes of Occitania (administrative region)